Wilm Dedeke ( – 1528) was a late gothic painter from Northern Germany.  He was born in Lübeck.

Dedeke completed the Altar of St. Luke (Lukas-Altar) at the Hamburg Mariendom in 1499 for the Hamburg Guild of Saint Luke. It had been left unfinished by his late colleagues Hinrik Bornemann and Absolon Stumme; Dedeke married the widow of the latter man. In 1502 he attained the title of Master of the Brotherhood of St. Thomas. He has been identified with the anonymous "Master of the Halepagen Altar".  He died in Hamburg.

Works 
 Wings of the Altar of the Brotherhood of Corpus Christi (1496) from the Cloisters in Lübeck, today in the St. Annen Museum
 Shrine of St. Anne (1500), also in the St. Annen Museum
 The Crucified Christ (1500), from the St. Catherine's Church, Hamburg, now in the collection of the Kunsthalle Hamburg
 Madonna with Child (1500), St. Annen Museum.

See also
 List of German painters

References

External links 
 
 Wilm Dedeke on the website of the  Museum of Schleswig-Holstein (In German)

1460 births
1528 deaths
Artists from Lübeck
Gothic painters
15th-century German painters
German male painters
16th-century German painters
Painters from Hamburg